The Bangey Heights (‘Bangeyski Vazvisheniya’ \ban-'gey-ski v&-zvi-'she-ni-ya\) are in Antarctica. They are the heights rising to 2997 m near Bezden Peak in north-central Sentinel Range in Ellsworth Mountains, extending 12 km in southwest–northeast direction and 10 km in northwest–southeast direction.  They are bounded by Patleyna Glacier to the west, Embree Glacier to the northwest and northeast, and Kopsis Glacier to the southeast, and linked to Probuda Ridge to the southwest by Chepino Saddle, and to Maglenik Heights to the south by Panicheri Gap. Their interior is drained by Marsa Glacier and Padala Glacier.

The heights are named after the settlement of Bangeytsi in northern Bulgaria.

Location
US mapping in 1961, updated in 1988.

See also
 Mountains in Antarctica

Geographical features include:

 Bezden Peak
 Chepino Saddle
 Embree Glacier
 Fucha Peak
 Golemani Peak
 Kopsis Glacier
 Marsa Glacier
 Mount Hleven
 Mount Schmid
 Oreshak Peak
 Padala Glacier
 Panicheri Gap
 Patleyna Glacier
 Probuda Ridge

Maps
 Vinson Massif.  Scale 1:250 000 topographic map.  Reston, Virginia: US Geological Survey, 1988.
 Antarctic Digital Database (ADD). Scale 1:250000 topographic map of Antarctica. Scientific Committee on Antarctic Research (SCAR). Since 1993, regularly updated.

Notes

References
 Bangey Heights. SCAR Composite Antarctic Gazetteer.
 Bulgarian Antarctic Gazetteer. Antarctic Place-names Commission. (details in Bulgarian, basic data in English)

External links
 Bangey Heights. Copernix satellite image

Mountains of Ellsworth Land
Bulgaria and the Antarctic